The Neftyanik Baku 1967 season was Neftyanik Baku's 11th  Soviet Top League season.

Competitions

Soviet Top League

Results

Table

Goal scorers
14 goals
 Eduard Markarov
13 goals
 Anatoliy Banishevskiy

References

External links 
 Neftchi Baku at Soccerway.com
 USSR, 1967. First group A Results at wildstat.com

Neftçi PFK seasons
Association football clubs 1967 season
1967 in Azerbaijan